The Blyavinsky mine is a large copper mine located in the south-west of Russia in Bashkortostan. Blyavinsky represents one of the largest copper reserve in Russia and in the world having estimated reserves of 139.3 thousand tonnes of ore grading 2.5% copper.

See also 
 List of mines in Russia

References 

Copper mines in Russia